Desmond Lee Ti-Seng (born 15 July 1976) is a Singaporean politician and lawyer who has been serving as Minister for National Development since 2020. A member of the governing People's Action Party (PAP), he has been the Member of Parliament (MP) representing the Boon Lay division of West Coast GRC since 2020. 

A lawyer by profession, Lee had worked at various public-sector institutions, including the Supreme Court, Attorney-General's Chambers and Temasek Holdings before entering politics. He made his political debut in the 2011 general election as part of a five-member PAP team contesting in Jurong GRC and won with 66.96% of the vote. He had held various political positions in the Ministry of National Development and Ministry of Home Affairs before he was made full member of the Cabinet on 1 May 2017.

Early life and education
Lee's father is Lee Yock Suan, a former Member of Parliament and Cabinet minister. Lee also has Peranakan ancestry from his mother's side.

Lee was educated at Anglo-Chinese School (Junior), Raffles Institution and Raffles Junior College before graduating from the National University of Singapore in 2001 with a Bachelor of Laws with first class honours degree. He subsequently went on to complete a Bachelor of Civil Law degree at the University of Oxford.

Legal career 
After graduating from NUS in 2001, Lee served as a Justices' Law Clerk at the Supreme Court before he became a Deputy Public Prosecutor in the Criminal Justice Division of the Attorney-General's Chambers.

From 2005 to 2009, Lee served as Deputy Director of the Legal Branch of the Ministry of Health. Later, he transferred to the Ministry of Law, where he served as Deputy Director of the Legal Policy Division until 2011.

In March 2011, Lee joined Temasek Holdings as an Associate Director in the Legal and Regulations Department.

Political career 
Lee left Temasek Holdings to stand for election in the 2011 general election as part of a five-member People's Action Party (PAP) team in Jurong Group Representation Constituency (GRC). The PAP team won the opposing National Solidarity Party team by 76,595 votes (66.96%) to 37,786 votes (33.07%). Lee then became a Member of Parliament representing the Jurong Spring ward of Jurong GRC.

Following the 2011 general election, Lee served as a member of the Government Parliamentary Committees for Culture, Community and Youth, Home Affairs, Law, and Social and Family Development.

On 1 September 2013, Lee was appointed Minister of State in the Ministry of National Development.

At the 2015 general election, Lee was re-elected as a Member of Parliament for Jurong GRC. The PAP team contesting in Jurong GRC won 79.3% of the votes cast. In October 2015, Lee was promoted to Senior Minister of State in the Ministry of National Development and Ministry of Home Affairs. On 1 May 2017, he became a full Minister and took up the positions of Minister in the Prime Minister's Office, Second Minister for Home Affairs and Second Minister for National Development. He was also Deputy Leader of the House in Parliament from October 2015 to June 2020.

On 11 September 2017, Lee relinquished his portfolios in the Prime Minister's Office and Ministry of Home Affairs, and became Minister for Social and Family Development while retaining his portfolio as Second Minister for National Development.

At the 2020 general election, Lee stood for election as part of a five-member PAP team in West Coast GRC and won with 51.69% of the vote against the Progress Singapore Party. He then became a Member of Parliament representing the Boon Lay ward of West Coast GRC.

Following a Cabinet reshuffle, on 27 July 2020, Lee succeeded Lawrence Wong as Minister for National Development and took on an additional newly-created position as Minister-in-charge of Social Services Integration at the Ministry of Social and Family Development.

On 8 November 2020, Lee, along with Lawrence Wong, were both elected into the PAP's Central Executive Committee for the first time.

Personal life 
Lee is married with three children.

References

External links

 Desmond Lee on Prime Minister's Office
 Desmond Lee on Parliament of Singapore

Members of the Parliament of Singapore
People's Action Party politicians
Raffles Junior College alumni
Anglo-Chinese School alumni
National University of Singapore alumni
Singaporean people of Hokkien descent
1976 births
Living people
Members of the Cabinet of Singapore